Tușnad may refer to:

 Tușnad, a commune in Harghita County, Romania
 Băile Tușnad, a town in Harghita County, Romania
 Tușnad (river), a tributary of the Olt in Romania